Neopaniasis is a genus of moths in the family Geometridae. It contains only one species, Neopaniasis aleopetra, which is found in Colombia.

References

External links

Ennominae